Jeanne Korevaar (born 24 September 1996) is a Dutch professional racing cyclist, who currently rides for UCI Women's WorldTeam . She is the younger sister of the cyclist Merijn Korevaar.

Major results
2018
 1st Stage 2 Belgium Tour
 1st  Young rider classification Women's Herald Sun Tour
 1st  Young rider classification Boels Ladies Tour
 6th Overall Tour Cycliste Féminin International de l'Ardèche
 7th Omloop Het Nieuwsblad
 8th Drentse Acht van Westerveld
 8th Three Days of Bruges–De Panne
 9th Overall Festival Elsy Jacobs

See also
 List of 2015 UCI Women's Teams and riders

References

External links
 

1996 births
Living people
Dutch female cyclists
People from Liesveld
Sportspeople from South Holland